Ancilla faustoi is a species of sea snail, a marine gastropod mollusk in the family Ancillariidae.

References

faustoi
Gastropods described in 1979